This is a list of flag bearers who have represented the Federated States of Micronesia at the Olympics.

Flag bearers carry the national flag of their country at the opening ceremony of the Olympic Games.

See also
Federated States of Micronesia at the Olympics

References

Micronesia, Federated States of
Olympic flagbearers
Flagbearers